Siphoneugena crassifolia (synonym Siphoneugenia widgreniana) is a species of plant in the family Myrtaceae. It is endemic to Brazil. Under the synonym Siphoneugenia widgreniana, it was considered vulnerable.

References

Flora of Brazil
widgreniana
Vulnerable plants
Taxonomy articles created by Polbot